Diastophya is a genus of longhorn beetles of the subfamily Lamiinae, containing the following species:

 Diastophya agetes Dillon & Dillon, 1952
 Diastophya albisetosa Dillon & Dillon, 1952
 Diastophya bimaculata Dillon & Dillon, 1952
 Diastophya fuscicollis Aurivillius, 1920

References

Cyrtinini